Szapiro is a Polish Jewish surname, a variant of Shapiro. Notable people with this surname include:

Anna Szapiro, mother of Georges Charpak
Deborah Szapiro, film producer
Jakub Szapiro, The King of Warsaw (TV series) main character 
Gedali Szapiro (Grzegorz Szapiro, Gedalia Shapira, 1929–1972), Polish–Israeli chess master
Hanna Sawicka (Hanna Krystyna Szapiro 1917–1943), Polish communist 
Henoch Szapiro (Henryk Szaro, 1900–1942), Polish screenwriter and film director
Klonimus Kalmish Szapiro (1889–1943), Grand Rabbi of Piaseczno, Poland
Marek Szapiro (1884-1942), artist
Salomea Szapiro, mother of Stefan Kisielewski
Salomon Szapiro (1882–1944), Polish chess master
Shayne-Feygl Szapiro (Dina Blond, 1887-1985), member of the Jewish Labour Bund in Poland and a prolific Yiddish translator
Willy Schapiro (also Szapiro or Schapira, 1910–1944), Polish Jew soldier

See also
Szpiro

Polish-language surnames
Yiddish-language surnames
Jewish surnames